Grace Meng (born October 1, 1975) is an American lawyer and politician serving as the U.S. representative for New York's 6th congressional district since 2013. A member of the Democratic Party, her district is in the New York City borough of Queens; it includes Bayside, Flushing, Forest Hills, Fresh Meadows, Glendale, Kew Gardens, Maspeth, Middle Village and Rego Park. Meng represented the 22nd district in the New York State Assembly from 2009 until 2012. She is the first Asian American elected to Congress from New York.

Early life
Grace Meng was born on October 1, 1975, in Queens, New York, and was raised in the Bayside and Flushing sections of that borough. She is of Taiwanese descent, and is the daughter of Jimmy Meng, an Assemblyman, and Shiao-Mei Meng. She attended Nathaniel Hawthorne Middle School and Stuyvesant High School and intended to become a teacher, according to a classmate. She received a B.A. degree from the University of Michigan and a Juris Doctor from the Benjamin N. Cardozo School of Law at Yeshiva University. One of her early mentors was Susan Wu Rathbone, founder of the Queens Chinese Women's Association.

New York Assembly
Meng's father, Jimmy Meng, was elected in 2004 to New York's 22nd assembly district, becoming the first Asian American to be elected to the legislature in New York State history. He was subsequently arrested for wire fraud during an FBI sting investigation. He served one term and decided against seeking reelection in 2006.

Elections
Meng ran for Assembly to succeed her father, but was taken off the ballot when Democrat Ellen Young challenged her residency status. Subsequently, her district residency issues were resolved. Young succeeded Jimmy Meng, taking office in January 2007. Jimmy Meng later pleaded guilty to wire fraud in connection with a bribery scheme.

Grace Meng challenged Young again in 2008. On September 9, she defeated Young in the Democratic primary, 59%-41%. She went on to win the November election, defeating Young again, this time as an Independence Party nominee, 88%-12%. In 2010, she was reelected unopposed.

Tenure
Meng was the author of the Reverse Mortgage Act of 2009 that prohibited proceeds received from reverse mortgages from being considered as income, so senior citizens can get their partial property tax exemption. Seven other of her pieces of legislation were signed into law.

In 2009, Meng was named one of City & State's "New York City Rising Stars: 40 Under 40".

U.S. House of Representatives

2012 election
In June 2012, Meng faced fellow Assembly member Rory Lancman and New York City Council member Elizabeth Crowley in a primary election for New York's 6th congressional district and won. She received the endorsement of the Queens County Democratic Party, and a New York Times reporter wrote that she was "poised to become the biggest political star from New York City's fastest-growing demographic group." Meng said her focus would be to create jobs, improve transportation, and grow tourism opportunities in her borough. On November 6, 2012, she won the race for New York's 6th congressional district against Republican member of the New York City Council Dan Halloran, making her the first Asian American elected to Congress from New York.

Congressional tenure

Inaugurated on January 3, 2013, Meng helped form the Bipartisan Freshman Caucus, asserting that "the American people are just sick and tired of blaming each other without getting anything done."

Her district includes the Queens neighborhoods of Auburndale, Bayside, Briarwood, Elmhurst, Flushing, Forest Hills, Fresh Meadows, Glendale, Kew Gardens, Kew Gardens Hills, Maspeth, Middle Village, and Rego Park.

On February 10, 2014, Meng introduced the bill To amend the International Religious Freedom Act of 1998 to include the desecration of cemeteries among the many forms of violations of the right to religious freedom (H.R. 4028; 113th Congress) into the House. The bill would amend the findings of the International Religious Freedom Act of 1998 by including the desecration of cemeteries among the various violations of the right to religious freedom. Meng said that "this legislation would be a new and important tool in our fight against the desecration of cemeteries" because it would "combat religiously-motivated vandalism of cemeteries and also prevent developers from building over cemeteries, a new and emerging threat in places where there are no Jewish communities left to protect burial grounds."

In 2015, Meng strongly opposed the Iran Nuclear Deal, the Joint Comprehensive Plan of Action supported by President Obama and Secretary of State John Kerry. Two years later, she boycotted Donald Trump's inauguration. In February 2017 she became Vice Chair of the Democratic National Committee (DNC) in Atlanta.

In July 2019, Meng reintroduced the Community College Student Success Act to improve graduation rates at under-resourced public community colleges to have the necessary funding to develop and implement support services for their low-income and minority students. It replicates nationwide the success of the CUNY Accelerated Study in Associate Programs which helps students earn associate degrees within 3 years by offering a range of financial, academic, and personal assistance. The program has been found to double the graduation rates of participants.

On February 23, 2021, Meng introduced House Resolution 151, "Condemning all forms of anti-Asian sentiment as related to COVID-19," responding to the growth of hate crimes against Asian-Americans, in the wake of Trump's repeated characterization of COVID-19 as "Kung Flu" and the "Chinese virus". It urged education and reporting about harassment. It drew initial support from 140 co-sponsors, and by March 3, 46 more, all Democrats.

As of September 2021, Meng had voted in line with Joe Biden's stated position 100% of the time.

Syria
In 2023, Meng was among 56 Democrats to vote in favor of H.Con.Res. 21, which directed President Joe Biden to remove U.S. troops from Syria within 180 days.

Committee assignments 

Committee on Appropriations
Subcommittee on Commerce, Justice, Science, and Related Agencies
Subcommittee on State, Foreign Operations, and Related Programs

Caucus memberships 
Congressional Asian Pacific American Caucus
Congressional Progressive Caucus
Medicare for All Caucus
Blue Collar Caucus

Personal life
Meng married Wayne Kye, a Korean American dentist and assistant professor at NYU, in June 2005. The couple resides in Queens with their two sons, Tyler Kye the elder, and Brandon Kye the younger. They attend a Protestant church in Forest Hills, Queens.

In November 2013, Meng was robbed and assaulted by a purse-snatcher in the Eastern Market area of Washington, D.C. She suffered injuries to her head, left knee, hand, and face, and was treated at George Washington University hospital.

Meng is Protestant.

Recognition 
In 2022, Meng received the Women's Entrepreneurship Day Organization’s Government Pioneer Award at the United Nations. The award, also recognized by Congress, highlights women entrepreneurs and their impact on the world.

See also
 Chinese Americans in New York City
 List of Asian Americans and Pacific Islands Americans in the United States Congress
 Taiwanese Americans in New York City
 Women in the United States House of Representatives

References

External links

Congresswoman Grace Meng official U.S. House website
Grace Meng for Congress

|-

|-

1975 births
Living people
American Protestants
American women lawyers
American women of Chinese descent in politics
American women of Taiwanese descent in politics
Asian-American people in New York (state) politics
Christians from New York (state)
Female members of the United States House of Representatives
Democratic Party members of the New York State Assembly
American politicians of Taiwanese descent
Asian-American members of the United States House of Representatives
Women state legislators in New York (state)
New York (state) lawyers
People from Queens, New York
Protestants from New York (state)
Stuyvesant High School alumni
University of Michigan alumni
Benjamin N. Cardozo School of Law alumni
Democratic Party members of the United States House of Representatives from New York (state)
21st-century American politicians
21st-century American women politicians
Members of the United States Congress of Chinese descent